Endemol Shine Nordics (formerly Metronome Film & Television and Shine Nordics)
is a Nordic media company specializing in film and television production. In 2009, it was bought by the British company Shine Group for £60 million (SEK 764m), which was in turn sold to the American News Corporation.

Outlets under Metronome Film & Television include:
Sweden
Meter Television
Stockholm-Köpenhamn
Friday TV
Filmlance International
Mekaniken Post Produktion
Norway
Rubicon TV
Metronome Spartacus
Denmark
Metronome Productions
Studios (Denmark)
Finland
Metronome Film & Television (Finland)

References

External links
 

Mass media companies of Sweden
Banijay